is a Japanese handball player for Hokkoku Bank and the Japanese national team.

She competed at the 2015 World Women's Handball Championship in Denmark.

References

1990 births
Living people
Place of birth missing (living people)
Japanese female handball players
Handball players at the 2014 Asian Games
Handball players at the 2018 Asian Games
Asian Games silver medalists for Japan
Asian Games bronze medalists for Japan
Asian Games medalists in handball
Medalists at the 2014 Asian Games
Medalists at the 2018 Asian Games
Handball players at the 2020 Summer Olympics
21st-century Japanese women
20th-century Japanese women